Nupserha perforata is a species of beetle in the family Cerambycidae. It was described by Stephan von Breuning in 1958. It is known from Ethiopia.

References

Endemic fauna of Ethiopia
perforata
Beetles described in 1958